The Geek Code, developed in 1993, is a series of letters and symbols used by self-described "geeks" to inform fellow geeks about their personality, appearance, interests, skills, and opinions. The idea is that everything that makes a geek individual can be encoded in a compact format which only other geeks can read. This is deemed to be efficient in some sufficiently geeky manner.

It was once common practice to use a geek code as one's email or Usenet signature, but the last official version of the code was produced in 1996, and it has now largely fallen out of use.

History
The Geek Code was invented by Robert A. Hayden in 1993 and was defined at geekcode.com. It was inspired by a similar code for the bear subculture - which in turn was inspired by the Yerkes spectral classification system for describing stars.

After a number of updates, the last revision of the code was v3.12, in 1996.

Some alternative encodings have also been proposed. For example, the 1997 Acorn Code was a version specific to users of Acorn's RISC OS computers.

Format
Geek codes can be written in two formats; either as a simple string:
 GED/J d-- s:++>: a-- C++(++++) ULU++ P+ L++ E---- W+(-) N+++ o+ K+++ w--- O- M+ V-- PS++>$ PE++>$ Y++ PGP++ t- 5+++ X++ R+++>$ tv+ b+ DI+++ D+++ G+++++ e++ h r-- y++** 
...or as a "Geek Code Block", a parody of the output produced by the encryption program PGP:
 -----BEGIN GEEK CODE BLOCK-----
  Version: 3.1
  GED/J d-- s:++>: a-- C++(++++) ULU++ P+ L++ E---- W+(-) N+++ o+ K+++ w---
  O- M+ V-- PS++>$ PE++>$ Y++ PGP++ t- 5+++ X++ R+++>$ tv+ b+ DI+++ D+++
  G+++++ e++ h r-- y++**
------END GEEK CODE BLOCK------
Note that this latter format has a line specifying the version of Geek Code being used.

(Both these examples use Hayden's own geek code.)

Encoding

Occupation
The code starts with the letter G (for Geek) followed by the geek's occupation(s): GMU for a geek of music, GCS for a geek of computer science etc. There are 28 occupations that can be represented, but GAT is for geeks that can do anything and everything - and "usually precludes the use of other vocational descriptors".

Categories
The Geek Code website contains the complete list of categories, along with all of the special syntax options.

Decoding
There have been several '"decoders" produced to transform a specific geek code into English, including:
 Bradley M. Kuhn, in late 1998, made Williams' program available as a web service. 
 Joe Reiss  made a similar page available in October 1999.

See also
Leet Speak
New Speak
The Natural Bears Classification System
Signature block

References

External links
Robert Hayden's official Geek Code web site (presenting v3.12)
Internet self-classification codes
Internet culture
Lifestyle websites
Nerd culture
1993 introductions